This article details the 2011–12 Indonesian Premier League.

Week 17

Week 16

Week 15

Week 14

Week 13

Week 12

Week 11

Week 10

Week 9

Week 8

Week 7

Week 6

Week 5

Week 4

Week 3

Week 2

Week 1

References

results